Nervijuncta is a genus of fungus gnats in the family Ditomyiidae.

Species
N. bicolor Edwards, 1927
N. concinna Matile, 1988
N. conjuncta (Freeman, 1951)
N. evenhuisi Matile, 1988
N. flavoscutellata Tonnoir, 1927
N. harrisi Edwards, 1927
N. hexachaeta Edwards, 1927
N. hudsoni (Marshall, 1896)
N. laffooni Lane, 1952
N. longicauda Edwards, 1927
N. marshalli Edwards, 1927
N. nigrescens Marshall, 1896
N. nigricornis Tonnoir, 1927
N. nigricoxa Edwards, 1927
N. ostensackeni Tonnoir, 1927
N. parvicauda Edwards, 1927
N. pilicornis Edwards, 1927
N. pulchella Edwards, 1927
N. punctata Tonnoir, 1927
N. ruficeps Edwards, 1927
N. tridens (Hutton, 1881)
N. vicina Matile, 1988
N. wakefieldi (Edwards, 1921)

References

Ditomyiidae
Sciaroidea genera